The Canary Murder Case is a 1929 American Pre-Code crime-mystery film based on the 1927 novel of the same name by S.S. Van Dine (the pseudonym for Willard Huntington Wright). The film was directed by Malcolm St. Clair, with a screenplay by Wright (under the Van Dine pseudonym), Albert Shelby LeVino, and Florence Ryerson. William Powell starred in the role of detective Philo Vance, with Louise Brooks co-starred as "The Canary"; Jean Arthur, James Hall, and Charles Lane also co-starred in other principal roles.

The first film to feature the Vance character, the film revolves around Vance's investigation into the murder of a conniving showgirl. It is a prime example of many films initially produced as a silent film before being turned into a "talkie", as the format quickly became the industry norm. The film was instrumental in expanding the career of Powell, who had previously been known in villain roles. Conversely, Brooks' refusal to participate in the sound reshoots famously led to controversy from which her career never recovered; her role was dubbed by Margaret Livingston.

The Canary Murder Case was released by Paramount Pictures on February 16, 1929, to mixed reviews; the dubbing of Brooks was heavily panned by critics. However, the film was successful enough that Powell filmed two sequels with Paramount, The Greene Murder Case (1929) and The Benson Murder Case (1930); as well as The Kennel Murder Case (1933) at rival studio Warner Bros.

Plot
Charles Spotswoode is happy when his son Jimmy breaks off his affair with conniving showgirl Margaret O'Dell – known as "The Canary" – and reconciles his engagement with her co-star and neighbor Alice La Fosse. Spotswoode goes to see The Canary to bribe her to leave Jimmy alone, but she declines his offer; she wishes to marry Jimmy to further her ambitions of joining the social elite. She threatens to reveal Jimmy's embezzlement from the elder Spotswoode's bank if Jimmy marries Alice, and despite his pleading, refuses to negotiate. After Spotswoode leaves, she telephones two club patrons she has been blackmailing, Cleaver and Mannix, to demand one final generous gift from each of them by the next day; she makes the same request of "creepy" admirer Dr. Lindquist. Her former husband Tony Sheel – who has broken into her apartment and has overheard her phone calls – demands half of the blackmail. She refuses to give him anything, even after he hits her. The following night around midnight, Spotswoode visits her again, but is again unable to change her mind. After he reaches the lobby of her building, he and another person hear screams from her place. They knock on the door, but she assures them that she is fine. Cleaver, Mannix and Lindquist are all shown lurking about her apartment building late that night.

The Canary is found strangled the next day; the coroner places the time of death around midnight. District Attorney Markham investigates, aided by Spotswoode's close friend Philo Vance, and Police Sergeant Heath. After all the suspects are brought in for questioning, Vance asks Markham to keep them waiting for a few hours. Markham agrees. Vance subtly maneuvers Cleaver, Mannix, Lindquist and the two Spotswoodes into playing poker to pass the time so he can observe their personality traits. Only one shows the daring, imagination and discipline required for the crime; that man bluffs Vance, betting everything with just a pair of deuces. The suspects are then released.

Sheel, who witnessed the murder while hiding in the closet, sends the killer several blackmail letters. He too is strangled. A pen found at the scene has Jimmy's name on it, so Heath arrests him for the murder. Jimmy then confesses to both murders, but Vance knows better. He telephones Charles Spotswoode with the news and suggests they meet in an hour. Spotswoode speeds to the city from his country estate to confess, but his chauffeur makes a fatal mistake by trying to beat a train to a crossing, and Spotswoode is killed. Now Vance has to show how Charles murdered the Canary in order to free Jimmy. He is able to prove that the Canary was dead before Spotswoode left her apartment that night. Spotswoode had made a recording (Vance speculates it was Spotswoode himself pretending to be the woman) to fool a stuttering witness into believing the Canary was alive after her death. The recording is found in the apartment, and Jimmy is released.

Cast
William Powell as Philo Vance
Jean Arthur as Alice La Fosse
James Hall as Jimmy Spotswoode 
Louise Brooks as "The Canary" / Margaret O'Dell
Margaret Livingston provided the voice of The Canary uncredited, and was a double for some reshot scenes.
Charles Willis Lane as Charles Spotswoode 
Lawrence Grant as Charles Cleaver 
Gustav von Seyffertitz as Dr. Ambrose Lindquist 
E. H. Calvert as Dist. Atty. John F.X. Markham 
Eugene Pallette as Sgt. Ernest Heath 
Ned Sparks as Tony Sheel 
Louis John Bartels as Louis Mannix
Tim Adair as George Y. Harvey (uncredited)
Oscar Smith as Elevator Boy (uncredited)

Production

The film was initially produced as a silent picture from September 11 to October 12, 1928, with Malcolm St. Clair directing. However, after production wrapped, Paramount looked to convert all of their silent films in the can into "talkies". Rival studio Warner Bros. had debuted the first full-talking picture Lights of New York earlier that year, and had proved to be extremely profitable for the studio. By the end of 1928, all of the major studios were preparing to quickly transition from silent pictures to sound. The Canary Murder Case was one example of a trend among the studios during this time: turning a silent picture into a talkie by dubbing the cast over scenes of the silent film, and adding some scenes.

Dubbing and reshoots were complete by December 28. The total cost of the picture, plus sound changes, was no more than $200,000.

Louise Brooks completed her contract for Paramount with the film, and declined to renew it after the studio refused her request for a raise. She left to make two films for director G. W. Pabst in Germany. Paramount cabled her in Berlin, demanding that she return to record her lines. Brooks took the position that she no longer had an obligation to Paramount, and refused. Unable to convince her to return, Paramount hired actress Margaret Livingston to dub Brooks' dialogue, and reshoot scenes where possible; Livingston was seen only in profile or from behind. Reshoots took place on December 19, 1928, with Frank Tuttle directing.

Reception
The film received mixed reviews from critics, with specific notice and criticism towards Livingston's dubbing over Brooks. The New York World stated the film was "an example of a good movie plot gone wrong as the result of spoken dialogue", while The Cincinnati Enquirer called Brooks "much more satisfying optically than auditorily."

Arthur herself later claimed that, during this time, she was a "very poor actress... inexperienced so far as genuine training was concerned."

Accolades
The film is recognized by American Film Institute in these lists:
 2003: AFI's 100 Years...100 Heroes & Villains:
 Philo Vance – Nominated Hero

Notes

References

Bibliography

External links

 
 
 

1929 films
1929 mystery films
American crime films
American mystery films
American black-and-white films
Films based on American novels
Films based on mystery novels
Films directed by Malcolm St. Clair
Films directed by Frank Tuttle
Films set in New York City
Films with screenplays by Florence Ryerson
Paramount Pictures films
Transitional sound films
1920s English-language films
1920s American films
Philo Vance films